Marriage Strike is a 1953 West German comedy film directed by Joe Stöckel and starring Erich Auer, Lore Frisch and Wastl Witt. It is a remake of the 1935 film of the same title directed by Georg Jacoby. It was shot at the Bavaria Studios in Munich and on location in Upper Bavaria. The film's sets were designed by the art director Carl Ludwig Kirmse.

Cast
Erich Auer as Ludwig
Lore Frisch as Peppi
Wastl Witt as Bartl
Elise Aulinger as Annamirl
Georg Bauer as Wurzer
Elfie Pertramer as Rosa
Gustl Gstettenbaur as Göppler
Ellen Hille as Mariandl
Beppo Brem as Schubert
Erni Singerl as Barbara
Willy Rösner as mayor
Dely Drexler as housekeeper
Barbara Gallauner as Kramerin
Harry Hertzsch as Zeiger
Gustav Waldau as Pfarrer
Hans Fitz as Bärenwirt
Walter Sedlmayr as Wimpflinger
Gabriele Reismüller as Hanni
Franz Loskarn as Gendarm

References

Bibliography
 Goble, Alan. The Complete Index to Literary Sources in Film. Walter de Gruyter, 1999.

External links

1953 comedy films
German comedy films
West German films
1950s German-language films
Films directed by Joe Stöckel
Remakes of German films
German films based on plays
Films set in Bavaria
German black-and-white films
1950s German films
Films shot at Bavaria Studios